Perittia weberella is a moth of the family Elachistidae. It is found in Switzerland.

There are probably two generations per year.

The larvae feed on Lonicera xylosteum. They mine the leaves of their host plant. The mine has the form of a corridor, abruptly widening into (and often overrun by) a blotch. The frass fills the corridor, but in the blotch it is distributed along the sides. Up to three mines may be found in a single leaf. Pupation takes place outside of the mine. Larvae can be found from June and July. They are whitish with red markings on the thorax.

References

Moths described in 1984
Elachistidae
Moths of Europe